Whiteside is a suburb in the Moreton Bay Region, Queensland, Australia.

Geography
Brisbane–Woodford Road (Dayboro Road) runs along the north-eastern boundary.

History
The European history of the area began 1843, when Captain Francis Henry (Frank) Griffin (ca. 1813-1881) became the first free settler to occupy the land. A short time later, Frank was joined by his brothers John and William. In 1845 they were joined by the mother Jane and father Gearbe who was the controlling partner in the property.  The run taken up by the Griffins for raising both cattle and sheep, which was named Whiteside, was an extensive portion of 28 square miles of land on the north bank of the North Pine River stretching from the sea coast as far west as Terror's Creek (now Dayboro) and northwards nearly as far as the Caboolture River.

Circa April 1847, it was alleged that servants at the Whiteside sheep station of Captain Francis Griffin mixed flour laced with arsenic and left in a hut with the expectation that Aboriginal people "would visit the hut and make use of the mixture". The act was reportedly in revenge for an aboriginal attack on a hutkeeper, who had been blinded by a blow to the head with a waddy. The servants denied mixing the flour with arsenic, claiming that both were separately kept in the hut and that the Aboriginal people must have combined them. 

The assault on the hut keeper and the killing of a shepherd appear to have been punishment under Aboriginal  customary law for a previous incident where three Aboriginal people were murdered and others injured by poisoning by the shepherd in question, according to Tom Petrie.

After the massacre of the 50-60 Aboriginal men, women and children, on March 2, George Griffin had taken his dray to Brisbane only to discover one of his employees, John Brown, at the  court office making a complaint about the massacre. It was reported that George Griffin immediately "galloped back to the station to warn his staff."

Upon being questioned about the massacre, the Griffins did not deny it, but claimed that it had been perpetrated by a servant no longer in their employ. History does not record any search for the alleged perpetrator or further investigation. Circa 1866, Edgar Foreman "saw scores of bleached bones including a complete skeleton" while riding in the vicinity, and heard that "fifty or sixty" Aboriginal people had lost their lives there by poisoning. Freeman claimed John Griffin of the Samsonvale cattle property told him that the deaths were caused by the Aboriginal people stealing from the hut and mixing them into dampers and Johnny cakes as they had seen the white men do and that over 50 Aboriginal people died from eating them.

Further violence occurred in September 1847 when a group of Aboriginal men attacked and killed some of the workers at a saw-pit.

The median age of the Whiteside population was 47 years, 10 years above the national median of 37. 79.3% of people living in Whiteside were born in Australia. The other top responses for country of birth were England 6.2%, New Zealand 2.7%, Germany 1.6%, United States of America 0.9%, Netherlands 0.9%. 91.5% of people spoke only English at home; the next most common languages were 1.7% Dutch, 1% Spanish, 0.6% Croatian, 0.4% German, 0.4% Italian.

Heritage listings 
Whiteside has a number of heritage-listed sites, including:

 Dayboro Road: North Pine Presbyterian Church
 Lake Kurwongbah-Dayboro Road: North Pine Pumping Station

Education 
There are no schools in Whiteside. The nearest primary school is in neighbouring Petrie. The nearest secondary school is in Bray Park.

References

Suburbs of Moreton Bay Region